The House of Gundelfingen was a Swabian noble family. First recorded in the 11th century, branches of the family held the lordships of Gundelfingen, Steusslingen and Justingen. Their ancestral seat was Burg Hohengundelfingen near Münsingen.

One Swigger von Gundelfingen is recorded in 1105. The division into three branches is a consequence of the turmoils of the interregnum after 1250. Hohengundelfingen castle was sold to the Habsburgs in 1293, with whom the Gundelfinger were in a feudal relationship until 1377. The Gundelfingen family rose to prominence in Swabia and Württemberg in the 15th century. The last representative of the family was Schweikhart von Gundelfingen (d. 1546). After his death, the Gundelfingen possessions passed to the Counts of Helfenstein.

Notable members of the family include
Konrad von Gundelfingen (1284–1302), as Konrad III prince-abbot of Kempten and anti-abbot of St. Gallen.
Andreas von Gundelfingen, bishop of Würzburg (1303–1313)
Konrad von Gundelfingen (Gundelfingen-Hellstein) (ca. 1270–1329), Deutschmeister of the Teutonic Order (1323–1329)
 Heinrich von Gundelfingen, prince-abbot of St Gallen (1411–1418)
 Heinrich von Gundelfingen (d. 1490), historiographer.
Barbara von Gundelfingen (1473–1523), abbess of Buchau

References 

 Alfons Uhrle: Regesten zur Geschichte der Edelherren von Gundelfingen, von Justingen, von Steusslingen und von Wildenstein. Tübingen 1960.
 Heinz Bühler: Die Edelherren von Gundelfingen-Hellenstein – Ein Beitrag zur Geschichte des ostschwäbischen Adels im hohen Mittelalter, in: Jahrbuch des Historischen Vereins Dillingen 73 (1971), 13–40.
 Alfons Uhrle: Beiträge zur Geschichte der Herren von Gundelfingen, in: Münsingen, Geschichte, Landschaft, Kultur. Festschrift zum Jubiläum des württembergischen Landeseinigungsvertrages von 1481, eds. Rudolf Bütterlin and Viktor Götz, Sigmaringen 1982, 175–195.
 Gunter Haug, Der erste Kreuzritter – Das abenteuerliche Leben des Swigger von Gundelfingen, 2005. 
 Gunter Haug: Die Herren von Gundelfingen. Baader–Verlag Münsingen, 1996.
 

Swabian nobility